In the 2018–19 season, CS Constantine competed in the Ligue 1 for the 21st season, as well as  the Champions League, and the Algerian Cup.

Pre-season

Mid-season

Overview

{| class="wikitable" style="text-align: center"
|-
!rowspan=2|Competition
!colspan=8|Record
!rowspan=2|Started round
!rowspan=2|Final position / round
!rowspan=2|First match
!rowspan=2|Last match
|-
!
!
!
!
!
!
!
!
|-
| Ligue 1

| 
| 7th
| 10 August 2018
| 26 May 2019
|-
| Algerian Cup

| Round of 64
| Semi-finals
| 27 December 2018
| 24 April 2019
|-
| Super Cup

| Final
| style="background:silver;"| Runners–up
| colspan=2| 1 November 2018
|-
| Champions League

| Preliminary round
| Quarter-finals
| 27 November 2018
| 13 April 2019
|-
! Total

Ligue 1

League table

Results summary

Results by round

Matches

Algerian Cup

Algerian Super Cup

The 2018 Algerian Super Cup is the 11th edition of the Algerian Super Cup, a competition with only one match, organized by the Professional Football League (LFP) and the Algerian Football Federation (FAF) since 2013. The Algerian Ligue Professionnelle 1 champion competes against the winner of the Algerian Cup.

Therefore, CS Constantine, the 2017-2018 champion of Algeria, played against USM Bel Abbès, winner of the 2017–18 Algerian Cup. The rules of the game are: the duration of the game is 90 minutes and in case of a tie, a session of penalties is performed to separate the teams. Three substitutions are allowed for each team.

Champions League

Preliminary round

First round

Group stage

Group C

Knockout stage

Quarter-finals

Squad information

Playing statistics

|-
! colspan=14 style=background:#dcdcdc; text-align:center| Goalkeepers

|-
! colspan=14 style=background:#dcdcdc; text-align:center| Defenders

|-
! colspan=14 style=background:#dcdcdc; text-align:center| Midfielders

|-
! colspan=14 style=background:#dcdcdc; text-align:center| Forwards

|-
! colspan=16 style=background:#dcdcdc; text-align:center| Players transferred out during the season

Goalscorers

Squad list
As of August 10, 2018.

Transfers

In

Out

Notes

References

2018-19
CS Constantine